Richard Henry Whiting (January 17, 1826 – May 24, 1888) was a U.S. Representative from Illinois.  He was the uncle of Rep. Ira Clifton Copley, and the grandfather of composer Richard A. Whiting.

Born in West Hartford, Connecticut, Whiting attended the common schools.
He moved to Altona, Illinois, in 1850, thence to Galesburg, Illinois, in 1860, where he built a gas works.
During the Civil War he served in the Union Army as paymaster of Volunteers 1862-1866.
He was appointed assessor of internal revenue for the fifth district of Illinois in February 1870, serving until May 20, 1873, when the office was abolished.
He was appointed collector of internal revenue for the same district May 20, 1873, with office at Peoria, Illinois, and served until his resignation on March 4, 1875, having been elected to Congress.

Whiting was elected as a Republican to the Forty-fourth Congress (March 4, 1875 - March 3, 1877).
He was not a candidate for renomination in 1876.
He served as delegate to the Republican National Convention in 1884.
He died in New York City, May 24, 1888.
He was interred in Springdale Cemetery, Peoria, Illinois.

References

 Richard H. Whiting in Kansas: a cyclopedia

1826 births
1888 deaths
People from West Hartford, Connecticut
Politicians from Peoria, Illinois
Union Army officers
Republican Party members of the United States House of Representatives from Illinois
19th-century American politicians